Roth is an unincorporated community in Buchanan County, Virginia, United States.

History
A post office was established at Roth in 1938 and operated until 1955. The community was named for E. H. Roth, a railroad official.

References

Unincorporated communities in Buchanan County, Virginia
Unincorporated communities in Virginia